Tadmur District is a district of the Homs Governorate in central Syria. Administrative centre is the city of Tadmur, near ancient Palmyra/Tadmor. At the 2004 census, the district had a population of 76,942.

Sub-districts
The district of Tadmur is divided into two sub-districts or nawāḥī (population as of 2004):
Tadmur Subdistrict (ناحية تدمر): population 55,062.
Al-Sukhnah Subdistrct (ناحية السخنة): population 21,880.

References

 

 
Districts of Homs Governorate